Gordon Johnston (May 25, 1874 – March 8, 1934) was an American soldier, Medal of Honor recipient and football player and coach. He played at the tackle position for Princeton University and served as the head coach of the University of North Carolina football team in 1896. He served as an officer in the United States Army during the Spanish–American War, the Philippine–American War and World War I, and received the Medal of Honor for his actions during the Philippine–American War.

Biography

Gordon Johnston was the son of Confederate General Robert Daniel Johnston, and was born in "the old home" near Birmingham, Alabama. After graduating from Birmingham High School, Johnston enrolled at Princeton University in New Jersey. While attending the university, Johnston played college football as a tackle for two years in 1894 and 1895. Football historian Parke H. Davis described Johnston as a "high spirited, fleetfooted, dashing" football player at Princeton. Johnston became a member of The Tiger Inn. He graduated from Princeton in 1896 and became the head football coach of the University of North Carolina football team in 1896.

In 1896, he also worked in the insurance business as a member of the Johnston & Badham firm in North Carolina. From 1897 to 1898, he was associated with the Buck Johnston Abstract Co. in Memphis, Tennessee.

In 1898, Johnston enlisted in the United States Army to fight in the Spanish–American War, serving in Cuba with the 1st U.S. Volunteer Cavalry Regiment, better known as the Rough Riders. After a brief return to civilian life, he was offered a commission as a second lieutenant in the Army in 1899 on the recommendation of Theodore Roosevelt.

Johnston was posted to the Philippines where he served with the 43rd Infantry Regiment in the Philippine–American War. On February 1, 1900 Johnston's actions as the leader of a small detachment of scouts was to earn him the nation's second highest award for bravery, the Distinguished Service Cross. The citation states: "... Lieutenant Johnston displayed remarkable gallantry and leadership in charging a greatly superior force of entrenched insurgents in the face of cannon and rifle fire, driving the enemy from their position and capturing the town of Palo."

Johnston returned to the United States, where he was the honor graduate in 1903 from the U.S. Army's infantry and cavalry school. In 1904, he was married to Anna Julia Johnson in Baltimore, Maryland.

Johnston returned to the Philippines as a first lieutenant in the Signal Corps with the 6th Infantry Regiment. On March 7, 1906, Johnston distinguished himself under heavy fire in the First Battle of Bud Dajo, where he was severely wounded. For his actions in this battle, Johnson received the Medal of Honor.

Johnston went on to lead a distinguished career in the Army. Johnston was to win the Distinguished Service Medal for his work as the chief of staff for the 82nd Infantry Division during the Meuse-Argonne Offensive of World War I. Johnston died in a polo accident at Fort Sam Houston on March 8, 1934.

He was buried at Arlington National Cemetery, in Arlington, Virginia. Camp Gordon Johnston in Carrabelle, Florida was named in his honor.

Medal of Honor citation
Citation:

Voluntarily took part in and was dangerously wounded during an assault on the enemy's works.

Head coaching record

See also

 List of Medal of Honor recipients

References

External links

 
 
 

1874 births
1934 deaths
19th-century players of American football
American football tackles
North Carolina Tar Heels football coaches
Princeton Tigers football players
American military personnel of the Philippine–American War
American military personnel of the Spanish–American War
Philippine–American War recipients of the Medal of Honor
Recipients of the Distinguished Service Cross (United States)
Recipients of the Silver Star
United States Army Medal of Honor recipients
Players of American football from Birmingham, Alabama
Polo deaths
Burials at Arlington National Cemetery
United States Army personnel of World War I
Deaths by horse-riding accident in the United States
Sports deaths in Texas